Paulo Manuel Carvalho de Sousa, CavIH (born 30 August 1970) is a Portuguese football manager and former professional player who played as a defensive midfielder. He is the current head coach of Italian  club Salernitana.

Starting his career at Benfica, he also represented Sporting CP in his country, where he amassed Primeira Liga totals of 117 matches and three goals in five years. From there onwards, he competed mainly in Italy and in Germany, winning the Champions League with Juventus and Borussia Dortmund and the Intercontinental Cup with the latter side. His later career was severely hampered by injuries.

Sousa was a member of Portugal's "Golden Generation", and appeared with the national team at the 2002 World Cup and two European Championships. He took up coaching in the late 2000s, managing clubs in several countries and winning national championships with Maccabi Tel Aviv and Basel. He was also in charge of Poland at Euro 2020.

Club career
Born in Viseu, Sousa began playing professionally for Benfica, and was a starter from an early age. He won the Primeira Liga championship in 1990–91, and the Taça de Portugal two years later. On 10 April 1993, in a league match at Boavista, he was forced to play in goal after Neno was sent off and his team had no more substitutions left, in an eventual 3–2 win.

In the summer of 1993, Sousa signed for Lisbon neighbours Sporting CP together with his teammate António Pacheco. In his only season, he partnered Luís Figo and Krasimir Balakov in midfield and the Lions did not win any silverware.

Sousa joined Juventus in 1994. In his first season in Turin he won the Serie A title, the domestic cup and the Supercoppa; they also finished as runners-up in the UEFA Cup, losing to fellow Italian side Parma. The following year, he was part of the squad that conquered the UEFA Champions League.

In the 1996 off-season, Sousa moved to Germany with Borussia Dortmund, where he repeated the Champions League triumph the following campaign, which made him only the second player after Marcel Desailly to win back-to-back titles with different teams; the final was against his former club Juventus and, although he appeared in that game, his spell was plagued with injuries, which followed him the remainder of his career.

Sousa subsequently returned to Italy to play for Inter Milan, and eventually retired at the age of 31 after a brief loan to Parma, followed by stints at Panathinaikos and Espanyol.

International career
A member of the Portugal team that won the 1989 FIFA World Youth Championship, Sousa went on to earn 51 caps for the senior side. His international debut came on 16 January 1991, in a friendly against Spain that ended in a 1–1 draw.

Sousa played for his country at UEFA Euro 1996 and 2000, and was a squad member at the 2002 FIFA World Cup, but did not take part in a single match. His last appearance came shortly before the latter competition, a 2–0 friendly win over China.

Style of play
Sousa was a hard-working, tactically intelligent and versatile player, who was effective both offensively and defensively, courtesy of his anticipation and ability to read the game, although he was not known for his speed. Although he was usually classified as a hard-tackling defensive midfielder, he also possessed excellent vision and control, and was often deployed as a deep-lying playmaker throughout his career due to his passing accuracy, technique and ability to control the tempo of his teams' play; his playing style drew comparisons with Paulo Roberto Falcão throughout his career.

In addition to his skill and creative abilities, Sousa was also renowned for his leadership.

Coaching career

Portugal national teams
Sousa began working as a manager by joining the coaching staff of the Portugal national team, taking the helm of the under-16s, and in the summer of 2008 he was appointed assistant to first-team coach Carlos Queiroz, his former boss at Sporting and the Portuguese youths.

Queens Park Rangers
On 19 November 2008, Sousa was appointed head coach of Championship team Queens Park Rangers. However, on 9 April 2009, he was sacked, as the club claimed he had divulged sensitive information without permission from the hierarchy, which included Dexter Blackstock's loan move to Nottingham Forest having been agreed without his knowledge.

Swansea City
Following Roberto Martínez's move to Wigan Athletic, Sousa was offered the role as Swansea City manager on 18 June 2009. He verbally accepted the deal, signing a three-year contract, and was officially appointed on the 23rd.

During the league campaign, Sousa led Swansea to its highest league finish for 27 years (seventh), just outside the play-offs. On 4 July 2010, he departed by mutual consent, set to take the vacant post at Leicester City.

Leicester City

Sousa became the new manager of Leicester City on 7 July 2010. Owner Milan Mandarić stated that he was delighted to "acquire a manager of such great calibre", adding he was "the right man to take our club forward".

On 1 October 2010, after less than three months in charge, Sousa was fired after a poor start to the season, with the team having won only once in his first nine league games.

Videoton
On 15 May 2011, Sousa signed a three-year contract with Hungarian club Videoton, newly crowned champions of the Nemzeti Bajnokság I. He made his competitive debut in the Champions League qualifying round to Sturm Graz in a 2–0 away loss, followed by an insufficient 3–2 home win.

His team hosted Trabzonspor in the season's Europa League last qualifying round on 30 August 2012, Sousa's 42nd birthday. After the 4–2 penalty shoot-out victory (0–0 after 120 minutes), he stated: "The qualification was the most beautiful birthday of my life".

On 7 January 2013, Videoton announced that they had agreed to terminate Sousa's contract due to family reasons. That same day, it was reported that he would become the new manager of the New York Red Bulls, but nothing came of it.

Five clubs in seven years (2013–2020)
On 12 June 2013, Maccabi Tel Aviv officially appointed Sousa as its head coach. He won the Israeli Premier League in his first and only season in charge.

Sousa changed clubs and countries again on 28 May 2014, signing a three-year contract with Basel in the Swiss Super League. He left on 17 June of the following year, after again winning the national championship.

On 21 June 2015, Sousa joined Serie A side Fiorentina. He left on 6 June 2017, following the appointment of Stefano Pioli.

On 6 November 2017, Sousa signed for Tianjin Quanjian of the Chinese Super League, replacing Fabio Cannavaro. On 4 October of the following year, he left his post.

Sousa became Bordeaux's third coach of the campaign on 8 March 2019 after Gus Poyet and Ricardo Gomes, agreeing to a three-and-a-half-year deal. Having come 12th in his only full season, disputes with the board led to his resignation on 10 August 2020.

Poland
On 21 January 2021, Polish Football Association (PZPN) president Zbigniew Boniek announced Sousa as the head coach of the Poland national team; he replaced Jerzy Brzęczek, who was dismissed in spite of achieving qualification for Euro 2020. In his first match in charge, on 25 March, his side drew 3–3 against Hungary in the 2022 World Cup qualification. At the former tournament finals, and in spite of three goals from star forward Robert Lewandowski, they exited in the group stage; nonetheless, the manager was assured to remain on the job.

Sousa led Poland to second place in their World Cup qualification group, reaching the play-offs but failing to be seeded after losing the last match to Hungary 2–1. The loss caused significant financial losses for the PZPN and the manager was criticised for not fielding several key players, including Lewandowski.

Sousa was allowed to leave on 29 December 2021, after agreeing to pay compensation.

Flamengo
Hours after leaving the Polish national team, Sousa was announced as the new manager of Flamengo in the Campeonato Brasileiro Série A on a two-year contract. Having observed the first two games of the Campeonato Carioca season, he won 3–0 at home to Boavista on his debut on 2 February 2022; his team lost the final 3–1 on aggregate to rivals Fluminense.

Sousa was dismissed on 9 June 2022, after a 1–0 loss to Red Bull Bragantino.

Salernitana
On 15 February 2023, Sousa returned to the Italian top division as the new head coach of Salernitana, replacing Davide Nicola.

Career statistics

Club

International

Managerial statistics

Honours

Player
Benfica
Primeira Divisão: 1990–91
Taça de Portugal: 1992–93
Supertaça Cândido de Oliveira: 1989

Juventus
Serie A: 1994–95
Coppa Italia: 1994–95
Supercoppa Italiana: 1995
UEFA Champions League: 1995–96

Borussia Dortmund
DFB-Supercup: 1996
UEFA Champions League: 1996–97
Intercontinental Cup: 1997

Portugal U20
FIFA U-20 World Cup: 1989

Portugal
UEFA European Championship third place: 2000

Individual
Guerin d'Oro: 1995

Manager
Videoton
Ligakupa: 2011–12
Szuperkupa: 2011, 2012

Maccabi Tel Aviv
Israeli Premier League: 2013–14

Basel
Swiss Super League: 2014–15

References

Further reading

External links

 

1970 births
Living people
People from Viseu
Sportspeople from Viseu District
Portuguese footballers
Association football midfielders
Primeira Liga players
S.L. Benfica footballers
Sporting CP footballers
Serie A players
Juventus F.C. players
Inter Milan players
Parma Calcio 1913 players
Bundesliga players
Borussia Dortmund players
Super League Greece players
Panathinaikos F.C. players
La Liga players
RCD Espanyol footballers
UEFA Champions League winning players
Portugal youth international footballers
Portugal under-21 international footballers
Portugal international footballers
UEFA Euro 1996 players
UEFA Euro 2000 players
2002 FIFA World Cup players
Portuguese expatriate footballers
Expatriate footballers in Italy
Expatriate footballers in Germany
Expatriate footballers in Greece
Expatriate footballers in Spain
Portuguese expatriate sportspeople in Italy
Portuguese expatriate sportspeople in Germany
Portuguese expatriate sportspeople in Greece
Portuguese expatriate sportspeople in Spain
Outfield association footballers who played in goal
Portuguese football managers
English Football League managers
Queens Park Rangers F.C. managers
Swansea City A.F.C. managers
Leicester City F.C. managers
Nemzeti Bajnokság I managers
Fehérvár FC managers
Israeli Premier League managers
Maccabi Tel Aviv F.C. managers
Swiss Super League managers
FC Basel managers
Serie A managers
ACF Fiorentina managers
U.S. Salernitana 1919 managers
Chinese Super League managers
Ligue 1 managers
FC Girondins de Bordeaux managers
Campeonato Brasileiro Série A managers
CR Flamengo managers
Poland national football team managers
UEFA Euro 2020 managers
Portuguese expatriate football managers
Expatriate football managers in England
Expatriate football managers in Wales
Expatriate football managers in Hungary
Expatriate football managers in Israel
Expatriate football managers in Switzerland
Expatriate football managers in Italy
Expatriate football managers in China
Expatriate football managers in France
Expatriate football managers in Poland
Expatriate football managers in Brazil
Portuguese expatriate sportspeople in England
Portuguese expatriate sportspeople in Wales
Portuguese expatriate sportspeople in Hungary
Portuguese expatriate sportspeople in Israel
Portuguese expatriate sportspeople in Switzerland
Portuguese expatriate sportspeople in China
Portuguese expatriate sportspeople in France
Portuguese expatriate sportspeople in Poland
Portuguese expatriate sportspeople in Brazil